"I'll Be There for You" is a song by American rock band Bon Jovi, released as the third single from their 1988 album, New Jersey. The power ballad was written by Jon Bon Jovi and Richie Sambora. The single reached number one on the US Billboard Hot 100 and number five on the Album Rock Tracks chart.

Background
Originally released on the 1988 album New Jersey, "I'll Be There for You" is a glam metal power ballad. It became Bon Jovi's third single from the album when it was released as a single in 1989.  As the band (and glam metal) was at its peak popularity at this time, the song quickly climbed to the number one position on both the Cash Box Top 100 and Billboard Hot 100, becoming their fourth number-one single. Cash Box ranked it as the number-two pop single of 1989.

Music video
The video for the song (directed by Wayne Isham) features the band performing on a dark stage with an almost monochromatic blue color due to the stage lighting, with close-ups of each member, most notably lead singer Jon Bon Jovi and lead guitarist Richie Sambora. However, it is persistent throughout the clip that Richie Sambora's face is constantly in shadow through the entire video. The video footage then switches midway to black-and-white footage from a Bon Jovi concert at the old Wembley Arena in London, England.

"Homebound Train"
"Homebound Train", the B-side to "I'll Be There for You", is notable for being one of the band's heaviest songs, and also for the brief back-and-forth keyboard and harmonica solos leading up to the guitar solo. When played during The Circle Tour, it was sung by lead guitarist Richie Sambora.

Charts

Weekly charts

Year-end charts

See also
 List of glam metal albums and songs

References

External links
 

1989 singles
Bon Jovi songs
Billboard Hot 100 number-one singles
Cashbox number-one singles
1980s ballads
Music videos directed by Wayne Isham
Songs written by Richie Sambora
Songs written by Jon Bon Jovi
Song recordings produced by Bruce Fairbairn
Mercury Records singles
1988 songs
Glam metal ballads